Stephen McNeil (born November 10, 1964) is a Canadian politician who served as the 28th premier of Nova Scotia, from 2013 to 2021. He also represented the riding of Annapolis in the Nova Scotia House of Assembly from 2003 to 2021 and was the leader of the Nova Scotia Liberal Party from 2007 to 2021.

Early life
McNeil was born in Halifax, Nova Scotia, the 12th of 17 children. His mother, Theresa McNeil, was the first female high sheriff in Canada and is a recipient of the Order of Nova Scotia. McNeil attended the Nova Scotia Community College, and owned a small business for 15 years between 1988 and 2003.

Political career
McNeil first sought election in 1999 but was defeated. During that election McNeil indicated in a questionnaire provided by the campaign life coalition that he was pro-life. In 2013 a spokesperson for McNeil said his views had evolved since 1999 and he was no longer pro-life. He ran again in 2003 and was elected to the Nova Scotia House of Assembly.

On January 30, 2007, McNeil announced he would run in the election to become leader of the Liberal Party. He was endorsed by Leo Glavine, Harold Theriault, Wayne Gaudet, Robert Thibault, Rodger Cuzner, Jim Cowan, Don Downe and Dr. Jim Smith. On April 28, 2007 at the Liberal Leadership Convention in Dartmouth, Nova Scotia, McNeil was elected leader on the second ballot over runner-up Diana Whalen.

In the 2009 election, McNeil led the Liberals to Official Opposition status, winning 11 seats.

In the 2013 election, his party won a majority government, defeating the NDP government of Darrell Dexter.

In the 2017 election, his party retained a reduced majority of 27 seats in the legislature.

On August 6, 2020, McNeil announced that he would resign as leader of the Liberal Party and as Premier of Nova Scotia in early 2021. He was succeeded by Rankin as Liberal leader on February 6, 2021 and as premier on February 23, 2021.

Premier of Nova Scotia

McNeil was sworn in as Premier of Nova Scotia, along with his cabinet by Lieutenant Governor of Nova Scotia John James Grant on October 22, 2013 in Annapolis Royal. This was the first time since 1954 that the swearing in ceremony has been held outside the provincial capital of Halifax. McNeil is leading the first Liberal government in Nova Scotia in 14 years after a majority win to take 33 of Nova Scotia's 51 provincial seats; during much of that time the Nova Scotia Liberal Party held third party status in the legislature.

The McNeil government faced difficulty in the first year of its government with two controversial stories about patronage and nepotism. Just days after being sworn in, Liberal candidate Glennie Langille was offered the job of Chief Protocol Officer. Critics said this was a return to days of political patronage and the job should have gone to the most qualified candidate in an open competition, while advocates said the Premier had done nothing against the rules.  A government contract given to the premier's brother was also questioned. Critics had a problem with the fact that McNeil's brother's company was not officially registered with the Registry of Joint Stocks until the day after the tender closed, while advocates said being the premier's brother should not preclude him from receiving government contracts. Nova Scotia's Conflict of Interest Commissioner found no conflict with McNeil's brother's contract.

The McNeil government's first session of the legislature lasted only 11 sitting days, the shortest fall sitting since fall sittings were made mandatory in 1994. The McNeil government was not required to hold a fall session of the legislature, as legislative sessions are not required for six months after an election. Campaign commitments by McNeil's Liberal government were met during the first session of the Nova Scotia House of Assembly, passing three significant pieces of legislation during this session. The first was a law meant to open the electricity market to more producers. Critics said this law would neither reduce power rates, nor break Nova Scotia Power's monopoly, while advocates said it would soon allow for renewable electricity companies to sell directly to consumers. Another piece of notable legislation was for a statutory holiday in February. Critics said this would hurt the small business community, while advocates said it would help families spend more time together. Another commitment met included legislation to make economic investments more transparent and accountable.  Another piece of notable legislation was the Liberal government's commitment to ban the importation of fracking wastewater from other jurisdictions.

The McNeil government's first spring of the legislature saw three significant controversies. The Liberals passed essential services legislation that ended a strike by nurses in Halifax who were protesting working conditions. Opponents of Bill 37 said it took away the right to fair collective bargaining and would set back labour relations in the province, while the government said it was necessary to protect health care. Public sector workers from various unions protested the bill.

The second controversial legislation was the Financial Measures Act, which eliminated the Graduate Retention Rebate – a tax rebate given to graduates who stayed in the province to work. The government said the program was not working and that student groups wanted it cut.

The third controversy stemmed from the McNeil government's April 2015 budget. The budget provided for the elimination of the crown agency Film and Creative Industries Nova Scotia, as well as an overhaul of the long-standing Nova Scotia Film Tax Credit. This move appeared to break a pre-election promise made by McNeil in October 2013, and resulted in an outpouring of protest from the creative community. Under political pressure, McNeil was forced to abandon the changes tabled in the budget. The Liberal government instead come up with a new incentive program for the film and television industry: the Nova Scotia Film Production Incentive Fund.

The Liberals' first budget forecast a $279 million deficit, and included money to cap class sizes and recruit doctors.  Two significant pieces of legislation were introduced. The government took the interest off Nova Scotia student loans for graduates who stay in Nova Scotia, and created a jobs fund called Invest Nova Scotia. McNeil announced on August 6, 2020, that he would be stepping down as Premier of Nova Scotia and leaving public office. In his announcement he confirmed he will remain as premier and leader of the Liberal Party until Iain Rankin is sworn in.

Electoral record

|-

|Liberal
|Stephen McNeil
|align="right"|6,410
|align="right"|64.72
|align="right"|-11.16
|-

|New Democratic Party
|Colin Sproul
|align="right"|1,517
|align="right"|15.31
|align="right"|+7.1
|-

|Progressive Conservative
|Virginia Hurlock
|align="right"|1,480
|align="right"|14.94
|align="right"|+1.26
|-

|-
 
|}

|-

|Liberal
|Stephen McNeil
|align="right"|7,709
|align="right"|75.88
|align="right"|+2.56
|-

|Progressive Conservative
|Virginia Hurlock
|align="right"|1,390
|align="right"|13.68
|align="right"|+2.63
|-

|New Democratic Party
|Henry Spurr
|align="right"|834
|align="right"|8.21
|align="right"|-5.17
|-

|}

|-

|Liberal
|Stephen McNeil
|align="right"|6,446
|align="right"|73.32
|align="right"|+17.12
|-

|New Democratic Party
|Henry Spurr
|align="right"|1,176
|align="right"|13.38
|align="right"|-3.37
|-

|Progressive Conservative
|Kent Robinson
|align="right"|971
|align="right"|11.05
|align="right"|-5.7
|-

|}

|-

|Liberal
|Stephen McNeil
|align="right"|4668
|align="right"|56.20
|align="right"|+5.37
|-

|Progressive Conservative
|Blair Hannam
|align="right"|2041
|align="right"|24.57
|align="right"|-6.85
|-

|New Democratic Party
|Malcolm John (Calum) MacKenzie
|align="right"|1391
|align="right"|16.75
|align="right"|+1.1
|-

|}

|-

|Liberal
|Stephen McNeil
|align="right"|4522
|align="right"|50.83
|align="right"|+12.01
|-

|Progressive Conservative
|Frank Chipman
|align="right"|2795
|align="right"|31.42
|align="right"|-15.61
|-

|New Democratic Party
|Adrian Nette
|align="right"|1395
|align="right"|15.68
|align="right"|-2.75

|}

|-

|Progressive Conservative
|Frank Chipman
|align="right"|4026
|align="right"|43.43
|align="right"|+9.1
|-

|Liberal
|Stephen McNeil
|align="right"|3265
|align="right"|35.22
|align="right"|-1.8
|-

|New Democratic Party
|Tom Clahane
|align="right"|1708
|align="right"|18.43
|align="right"|-8.1

|}

References

External links
 Members of the Nova Scotia Legislative Assembly
 Liberal caucus profile
 Canadian Encyclopedia entry on Stephen McNeil

Nova Scotia Liberal Party MLAs
People from Annapolis County, Nova Scotia
Nova Scotia political party leaders
Living people
1964 births
Premiers of Nova Scotia
Members of the Executive Council of Nova Scotia
21st-century Canadian politicians